Darren Caldeira (born 19 September 1987) is an Indian former professional association footballer who played as a central midfielder. He is currently serving as director of football for Bengaluru FC. Caldeira has also worked as a commentator in the Indian Super League for Star Sports.

Career

Early career
Born in Mumbai, Maharashtra, India, Caldeira spent his youth career with Mahindra United. He later spent a year with the under-18 team of Spanish La Liga side Valencia CF. Then in 2010, after Mahindra United disbanded, Caldeira signed with Air India FC of the I-League. After spending two seasons with Air India Caldeira signed with Mumbai FC.

Bengaluru FC
In July 2013, it was announced that Caldeira had signed with new direct-entry side Bengaluru FC. He then made his debut for the side on 29 September 2013 against Rangdajied United F.C. in which he started and played the full 90 minutes as Bengaluru won the match 3–0.

He was signed by Bengaluru FC again in August 2016 for a four-months deal, and was released by the club in November 2016.

Mumbai
In 2015, Caldeira signed for Mumbai FC

Chennai City
In 2017, Caldeira was signed by new I-League entrant Chennai City FC and made his first appearance for the club as a substitute in the first game against Minerva Punjab F.C.

ATK
In September 2017 he joined ATK of Indian Super League. This was his first ever stint in ISL. He didn't really have an ideal season for ATK and couldn't do anything to turn around their disappointing campaign. He was given a lot of opportunities by manager Ashley Westwood and even though he did well to keep things moving in midfield, he lacked an attacking spark.

Mohun Bagan
In July 2018 it was announced that Mohun Bagan have signed caldeira for the upcoming Calcutta Football League & I-League seasons.

Final years at Kerala Blasters
In 2019, Caldeira was signed by Indian Super League side Kerala Blasters. He was affected by a sports injury, and only made one appearance during the season. At the age of 33, he retired from professional on 31 December 2020.

Career statistics

See also
 List of Indian football players in foreign leagues

References

External links

Darren Caldeira at Indian Super League

1987 births
Living people
Footballers from Mumbai
Indian footballers
Air India FC players
Mumbai FC players
Bengaluru FC players
Association football midfielders
I-League players
Kerala Blasters FC players
Indian expatriate footballers
Association football commentators